John Danby may refer to:

John Danby (footballer) (born 1983), professional footballer
John Danby (ice hockey) (born 1948), Canadian former major league ice hockey player
John Danby (musician) (1757–1798), English composer

See also
Danby (disambiguation)